Theodoros "Thodoris" Karras (born December 18, 1997) is a Greek professional basketball player for Karditsa of the Greek Basket League. At a height of 2.10 m (6' 10") tall, with a 2.30 m (7' 6") wingspan, he plays at the center position.

Professional career
Karras began his professional career in the 2015–16 season, in the Greek 2nd Division, with Doukas. In the summer of 2017, Karras joined PAOK Thessaloniki of the Greek Basket League and the Basketball Champions League, signing a four-year contract.  On July 28, 2020, he was released from the club.

Greek national team
Karras was a member of the Greek junior national teams. With Greece's junior national team, he played at the 2017 FIBA Europe Under-20 Championship, where he won a gold medal. He averaged 9.7 points and 3.6 rebounds per game, at the tournament.

References

External links
FIBA Archive profile
Eurobasket.com profile
RealGM.com profile
Greek Basket League profile 
Greek Basket League profile 
PAOK profile

1997 births
Living people
ASK Karditsas B.C. players
Centers (basketball)
Doukas B.C. players
Greek men's basketball players
P.A.O.K. BC players
Basketball players from Athens